The Dawulun Fort, also Ta Wu Lun Fort, is a former fort on Mount Dawulun (Ta-wu-lun, Dia buron), Anle District, Keelung, Taiwan.

History
The fort was built in 1820 and it used to be a very important military base to safeguard the west side of Keelung Harbor. During the First Opium War in 1840 and Sino-French War in 1884, the court of Qing Dynasty sent military forces to guard the place.

Architecture
The area consists of fort, chassis, mechanical belt, tunnels, barracks, trenches and storage room. Walls are made of stones with arched windows. It is located at 231 meters above sea level.

Transportation
The fort is accessible by bus from Keelung Station of Taiwan Railways.

Gallery

See also
 List of tourist attractions in Taiwan

References

1820 establishments in Taiwan
Forts in Keelung
National monuments of Taiwan